The Lamborghini Egoista is a concept car unveiled by Lamborghini for the company's 50th anniversary. The fully functioning model is based on the Gallardo. It features a  V10 engine producing .

The Lamborghini Egoista has a unique one-seat cockpit, which is similar to that of a modern fighter jet, and has a canopy door that is completely removable. The steering wheel must be removed to enter and exit the vehicle like a Formula One car.

The unique exterior of the Lamborghini Egoista is meant to resemble a bull ready to charge if looked at from the side. The lighting resembles that of a modern airplane, with sidemarkers and indicators on the sides and top of the car as well as front and rear. The bodywork consists of active aerodynamic panels that raise and lower for optimum downforce and stability. The body and wheels are made of antiradar material to even more identify with fighter jets.

In Dutch, Italian, Spanish, Czech, Portuguese, Polish, Romanian, Hungarian, Serbian and French, Egoista literally means "selfish". According to the model's designer Walter de Silva, the Egoista "represents hedonism taken to the extreme".

The car is now on display at the Museo Lamborghini located in Sant'Agata Bolognese.

References 

Egoista
2010s cars
One-off cars
Sports cars
Rear mid-engine, all-wheel-drive vehicles